Savan-e Jadid (also Romanized as Sāvān-e Jadīd; also known as Sāvān) is a village in Gavork-e Nalin Rural District of Vazineh District of Sardasht County, West Azerbaijan province, Iran. At the 2006 National Census, its population was 553 in 98 households. The following census in 2011 counted 821 people in 174 households. The latest census in 2016 showed a population of 1,002 people in 264 households; it was the largest village in its rural district.

References 

Sardasht County

Populated places in West Azerbaijan Province

Populated places in Sardasht County